This article presents a list of the historical events and publications of Australian literature during 1956.

Books 

 Miles Franklin – Gentlemen at Gyang Gyang : A Tale of the Jumbuck Pads on the Summer Runs
 Nevil Shute – Beyond the Black Stump
 Randolph Stow – A Haunted Land
 Kylie Tennant – The Honey Flow
 E. V. Timms – Shining Harvest
 Arthur Upfield – Man of Two Tribes
 F. B. Vickers – First Place to a Stranger
 Morris West
 Gallows on the Sand
 Kundu

Short stories 

 Ethel Anderson – At Parramatta
 Leon Gellert – Year After Year
 Alan Marshall – How's Andy Going?
 Katharine Susannah Prichard – "N'Goola"
 David Rowbotham – Town and City : tales and sketches
 Judith Wright – "The Vineyard Woman"

Children's and Young Adult fiction 

 Mavis Thorpe Clark – The Brown Land Was Green

Poetry 

 Bruce Beaver – "Cow Dance"
 David Campbell – The Miracle of Mullion Hill : Poems
 Rosemary Dobson – "Cock Crow"
 R. D. Fitzgerald – "This Night's Orbit"
 Mary Gilmore – "The Waradgery Tribe"
 Gwen Harwood – "The Old Wife's Tale"
 James McAuley
 "Merry-Go-Round"
 "Vespers"
 A Vision of Ceremony : Poems
 Ronald McCuaig – "Betty by the Sea"
 J. S. Manifold – "Fife Tune"
 Vivian Smith
 "For My Daughter"
 The Other Meaning
 Douglas Stewart – "A Country Song"
 Judith Wright
 A Book of Australian Verse (edited)
 "The Forest"

Biography 

 Charmian Clift – Mermaid Singing
 Ion Idriess – The Silver City
 Jack Lang – I Remember
 Ruth Park & D'Arcy Niland – The Drums Go Bang!

Awards and honours

Literary

Children's and Young Adult

Poetry

Births 

A list, ordered by date of birth (and, if the date is either unspecified or repeated, ordered alphabetically by surname) of births in 1956 of Australian literary figures, authors of written works or literature-related individuals follows, including year of death.

 28 January – Tim Flannery, scientist and science writer
 5 November – Gig Ryan, poet

Unknown date
 Judith Beveridge, poet and editor
 Susan Johnson, novelist

Deaths 

A list, ordered by date of death (and, if the date is either unspecified or repeated, ordered alphabetically by surname) of deaths in 1956 of Australian literary figures, authors of written works or literature-related individuals follows, including year of birth.

 3 March – Dale Collins, journalist and novelist (born 1897)
 15 April – Jane Fletcher, poet, nature writer and children's writer (born 1870)
 25 August – Lilian Turner, writer for children (born 1867)
 20 September – Flora Eldershaw, novelist (born 1897)

See also 
 1956 in Australia
 1956 in literature
 1956 in poetry
 List of years in Australian literature
 List of years in literature

References

 
Australian literature by year
20th-century Australian literature
1956 in literature